Madison is a borough in Morris County, in the U.S. state of New Jersey. As of the 2020 United States census, the borough's population was 16,937, an increase of 1,092 (+6.9%) from the 2010 census count of 15,845, which in turn reflected a drop in population of 685 (−4.1%) from the 16,530 counted in the 2000 census.

Located along the Morris & Essex Lines, it is noted for Madison's historic railroad station becoming one of America's first commuter railroads, attracting well-to-do families from nearby Manhattan. It remains a popular commuter town for residents who work in New York City. The community maintains a population of nearly 18,000 residents. It is known as "The Rose City" and was named in honor of President James Madison.

Madison was ranked 33rd in Money Magazine's 2011 ranking of the "Best Places to Live", the 3rd highest-ranked place in New Jersey and second highest in Morris County behind Montville. New Jersey Monthly magazine ranked Madison first in the state in its 2019 rankings of the "Best Places to Live" in New Jersey.

Often regarded as a college town, along the Florham Park–Madison–Convent Station (Morris Township) border are three universities including Drew University, the Florham Campus of Fairleigh Dickinson University and the College of Saint Elizabeth located in Convent Station. Madison is home to the Shakespeare Theatre of New Jersey, one of the largest professional Shakespeare companies in North America.

History
Native Americans occupied the areas that would become New Jersey, and Madison, following the retreat of the Wisconsin Glacier for many thousands of years. Settlements of the Lenape were agriculturally based following matrilineal lines. The protected lands nearby, Jockey Hollow, are what is remaining of the settlement.  Occupation changed with the seasons, the variable nature of the climate, and to preserve the fertility of the rich soil. Their fishing and hunting territories were wide-ranging and similarly divided among the three clans of the matrilineal culture in this Eastern Woodland environment. Trade with these native peoples for food and furs was conducted by the Dutch during the period of colonization of New Netherland. Although the European principle of land ownership was not recognized by the Lenape, Dutch West India Company policy required their colonists to purchase land that they settled, but typically, trading relationships were established in this area, rather than Dutch settlements.

During the British colonial period, the earliest settlers of European descent arrived in this portion of the colony of New Jersey. Traditional native trails and pathways were followed as settlement began. Pressures upon the Lenape constantly drove them westward. About 1715 the village of Bottle Hill was established at the crossing of Ridgedale Avenue and Kings Road. Village governance principles followed the British model. The Luke Miller house at 105 Ridgedale Avenue is thought to be the oldest remaining home, having been built around 1730. During British colonial rule, Kings Road was a toll road that assessed fees levied by the government appointed by the English king. Farther south was the Shunpike, a road with a parallel path that was used by colonists to avoid the fees.

Morris County, created in 1739, was divided into three townships. The portion of the village north of Kings Road was put under the governance of Hanover Township and the portion to the south, under the governance of Morris Township. A meeting house for the Presbyterian Church of South Hanover, as Madison was then called, was started in 1747 where the Presbyterian Cemetery still exists between Kings Road and Madison Avenue. With the Treaty of Easton in 1758, the Lenape were required to vacate their lands in colonial New Jersey and to move westward. Their leaders allied with the colonists during the American Revolutionary War in hopes of regaining former lands, but those hopes were never realized.

Following the revolution, changes to governing the former colonies occurred gradually as the new nation organized. The state of New Jersey formed its government and debated best policies. During the reorganization of Morris County in 1806, Chatham Township was established and included all of present-day Chatham Township, along with the three existing pre-Revolutionary War villages (the municipalities of Chatham, Florham Park, and Madison) as well as all of the lands still governed by the Chatham Township, and thus the governmental division of Bottle Hill was ended.

In 1834, the name of the settlement was changed to Madison. As a tribute to the name every year there is a fair that is called Bottle Hill Day. On December 27, 1889, based on the results of a referendum passed on December 24, 1889, the village seceded from Chatham Township and adopted the newly created, borough government (when it first became available), to develop a local water supply system for its population of 3,250. Madison annexed additional portions of Chatham Township in 1891, and again each year from 1894 to 1898, which was followed by an exchange of certain lands in 1899 with Chatham Township.

Influence of early railroad 

 

The Morris and Essex Railroad connected the town with Newark and Hoboken in 1838 and provided good transportation for farm produce grown at Madison. Later, the railroad made possible the establishment of a flourishing rose growing industry, still commemorated in Madison's nickname, The Rose City. The rail service connected the commerce to the markets of Manhattan. Madison's growth accelerated after the Civil War and the Morris and Essex Lines became one of America's first commuter railroads, attracting well-to-do families from Manhattan (many of whom already owned large parcels land in the area for farming, hunting, and recreation) and contributing to the development of "Millionaire's Row", which stretched from downtown Madison to downtown Morristown. Greenhouses dotted the countryside. Talented horticulturalists were attracted to the area for employment at the many wealthy estates in the immediate area and to establish related businesses. One of the first grand houses to be built on "Millionaire's Row" was the Ross Estate. In 1893, Florence Adele Vanderbilt and her husband Hamilton McKown Twombly began to built the impressive Florham estate. Home to Fairleigh Dickinson University, Florham is a Gilded Age mansion and the 9th largest house in the United States.

Madison's historic railroad station was funded by the community, which passed an ordinance authorizing $159,000 for railroad improvement bonds.  The result, with the cooperation of the D.L. & W.R.R. in the planning, was completed in 1916. The tracks were elevated through the downtown so that no established roadways were hindered by crossing delays.  Mrs. D. Willis James financed much of the road grading caused by the elevation of the tracks. The station included baggage and cargo facilities readily accessible by wagon, as well as the stationmaster offices, a newsstand, and waiting facilities featuring extensive banks of high-backed wooden seating. Weeping mulberry trees were planted among the landscaping and in natural areas in the parking area.

The rose industry and the large estates in the area attracted working-class people of all kinds. As a result, Madison developed a diverse population very early, both in terms of socioeconomic status and ethnic background. The original settlers were of British stock; French settlers came after the American Revolution; African Americans have been members of the community from early in the nineteenth century; Irish came in the mid-nineteenth century; and then Germans and Italians arrived around the turn of the twentieth century. To this day there is a substantial population of Italian descent in Madison. Madison remains a diverse community, with recent newcomers arriving from Central America, South America, and Asia. Madison is a railroad suburb of New York City.

Geography
According to the United States Census Bureau, the borough had a total area of 4.33 square miles (11.20 km2), including 4.31 square miles (11.17 km2) of land and 0.01 square miles (0.03 km2) of water (0.30%).

Madison borders the Morris County municipalities of Chatham Borough to the east, Chatham Township to the south, Harding Township and Morris Township to the west and Florham Park to the north.

Unincorporated communities, localities and place names located partially or completely within the borough include Brooklake Park, East Madison and North Park.

Demographics

2010 census

The Census Bureau's 2006–2010 American Community Survey showed that (in 2010 inflation-adjusted dollars) median household income was $106,070 (with a margin of error of +/− $8,499) and the median family income was $139,886 (+/− $18,117). Males had a median income of $100,289 (+/− $12,722) versus $64,684 (+/− $10,127) for females. The per capita income for the borough was $54,518 (+/− $4,561). About 1.1% of families and 4.3% of the population were below the poverty line, including 1.6% of those under age 18 and 2.7% of those age 65 or over.

2000 census
As of the 2000 United States census there were 16,530 people, 5,520 households, and 3,786 families. The population density was 3,935.6 people per square mile (1,519.6/km2). There were 5,641 housing units at an average density of 1,343.1 per square mile (518.6/km2). The racial makeup of the population was 89.69% White, 3.00% African American, 0.13% Native American, 3.77% Asian, 0.23% Pacific Islander, 1.55% from other races, and 1.63% from two or more races. Hispanic or Latino of any race were 5.97% of the population.

There were 5,520 households, out of which 31.3% had children under the age of 18 living with them, 57.6% were married couples living together, 8.2% had a female householder with no husband present, and 31.4% were non-families. 25.6% of all households were made up of individuals, and 10.0% had someone living alone who was 65 years of age or older. The average household size was 2.53 and the average family size was 3.05.

The age distribution of the population shows 20.6% under the age of 18, 17.6% from 18 to 24, 28.3% from 25 to 44, 20.5% from 45 to 64, and 13.0% who were 65 years of age or older. The median age was 34 years. For every 100 females, there were 90.0 males. For every 100 females age 18 and over, there were 86.7 males.

The median income for a household was $82,847 and the median income for a family was $101,798. Males had a median income of $62,303 versus $42,097 for females. The per capita income was $38,416. About 2.0% of families and 3.4% of the population were below the poverty line, including 2.8% of those under age 18 and 4.3% of those age 65 or over.

Economy
Madison's downtown is supported by the Madison Downtown Development Commission and a downtown manager. Many historical buildings remain in the community. The Madison Civic Commercial Historic District, which includes much of "downtown" as well as the borough hall and the train station, is listed on the State Register of Historic Places. The borough hall was donated to the community by Geraldine R. Dodge and Marcellus Hartley Dodge Sr. as a memorial to their son who died in an automobile crash shortly after his graduation from Princeton University. Commercial vacancy rates are low. In recent years Madison has become noted for the number and quality of its restaurants.

Giralda Farms, a planned office development, occupies  of the former Geraldine R. Dodge estate in Madison (she and her husband had separate estates). The site includes the corporate headquarters of Quest Diagnostics. Covering , the site requires that all parking be underground and that 85% of the land be undeveloped.

Arts and culture
Every year, Madison has an event called Bottle Hill Day. During this time, the community is able to come down to the center of town to celebrate the community with games, food, music, and a variety of activities for as many as 20,000 participants.

Madison is home to the Shakespeare Theatre of New Jersey, one of 25 professional theatres in the state. Serving 100,000 adults and children annually, it is New Jersey's only professional theatre company dedicated to Shakespeare's canon and other classic masterworks. The F.M. Kirby Shakespeare Theatre, the company's main stage, is a short walk from Madison's downtown shopping district.

Madison is also home to the Museum of Early Trades and Crafts, a New Jersey history museum located in the historic downtown district. The building is listed on both the state and national registers of historic buildings. The museum houses a collection of more than 8,000 artifacts and is host to thousands of visitors each year, mostly school students on field trips.

In October 2017, it was announced that a long-lost sculpture by Auguste Rodin had been found in the Hartley Dodge Memorial. A student from Drew University, who had been hired to archive the art in the building, discovered the bust of Napoleon and reached out to the Comité Auguste Rodin in Paris to have it authenticated. A public viewing was held for locals before the statue was loaned to the Philadelphia Museum of Art.

Government

Local government

Madison is governed under the Borough form of New Jersey municipal government, which is used in 218 municipalities (of the 564) statewide, making it the most common form of government in New Jersey. The governing body is comprised of the Mayor and the Borough Council, with all positions elected at-large on a partisan basis as part of the November general election. The Mayor of Madison is elected directly by the voters to a four-year term of office. The Borough Council is comprised of six members elected to serve three-year terms on a staggered basis, with two seats coming up for election each year in a three-year cycle. The Borough form of government used by Madison, the most common system used in the state, is a "weak mayor / strong council" government in which council members act as the legislative body with the mayor presiding at meetings and voting only in the event of a tie. The mayor can veto ordinances subject to an override by a two-thirds majority vote of the council. The mayor makes committee and liaison assignments for council members, and most appointments are made by the mayor with the advice and consent of the council.

The Madison Municipal Building is the location since 1935 of a portrait of Abraham Lincoln, attributed to German immigrant artist W.F.K. Travers, painted from life in 1865.

, the mayor of Madison is Democrat Robert H. Conley, whose term of office ends December 31, 2023. Members of the borough council are Council President Robert E. Landrigan (D, 2023), Maureen Byrne (D, 2022), Debra Coen (D, 2024), Rachel F. Ehrlich (D, 2022), John Hoover (D, 2023) and Eric Range (D, 2024).

Mayors of Madison

Federal, state and county representation
Madison is located in the 11th Congressional District and is part of New Jersey's 27th state legislative district. Prior to the 2011 reapportionment following the 2010 Census, Madison had been in the 21st state legislative district. Due to the 2021 apportionment following the 2020 Census, in the state elections in November 2023 and the subsequent legislative sessions starting in 2024, Madison will be part of New Jersey's 25th state legislative district.

 

Morris County is governed by a Board of County Commissioners comprised of seven members who are elected at-large in partisan elections to three-year terms on a staggered basis, with either one or three seats up for election each year as part of the November general election. Actual day-to-day operation of departments is supervised by County Administrator, John Bonanni. , Morris County's Commissioners are
Commissioner Director Tayfun Selen (R, Chatham Township, term as commissioner ends December 31, 2023; term as director ends 2022),
Commissioner Deputy Director John Krickus (R, Washington Township, term as commissioner ends 2024; term as deputy director ends 2022),
Douglas Cabana (R, Boonton Township, 2022), 
Kathryn A. DeFillippo (R, Roxbury, 2022),
Thomas J. Mastrangelo (R, Montville, 2022),
Stephen H. Shaw (R, Mountain Lakes, 2024) and
Deborah Smith (R, Denville, 2024).
The county's constitutional officers are the County Clerk and County Surrogate (both elected for five-year terms of office) and the County Sheriff (elected for a three-year term). , they are 
County Clerk Ann F. Grossi (R, Parsippany–Troy Hills, 2023),
Sheriff James M. Gannon (R, Boonton Township, 2022) and
Surrogate Heather Darling (R, Roxbury, 2024).

Politics
As of March 2011, there were a total of 9,769 registered voters in Madison, of which 2,577 (26.4%) were registered as Democrats, 3,312 (33.9%) were registered as Republicans and 3,869 (39.6%) were registered as Unaffiliated. There were 11 voters registered as Libertarians or Greens.

In the 2020 presidential election, Democrat Joe Biden received 5,838 votes, ahead of Republican Donald Trump with 3,340 votes, and other candidates with 148 votes. In the 2016 presidential election, Democrat Hillary Rodham Clinton received 55.0% of the vote (4,421 cast), ahead of Republican Donald Trump with 37.1% (2,980 votes), and other candidates with 4.5% (359 votes), among the 8,032 ballots cast by the borough's 11,073 registered voters, for a turnout of 73.0%. In the 2012 presidential election, Republican Mitt Romney received 50.3% of the vote (3,715 cast), ahead of Democrat Barack Obama with 48.6% (3,589 votes), and other candidates with 1.0% (76 votes), among the 7,416 ballots cast by the borough's 10,438 registered voters (36 ballots were spoiled), for a turnout of 71.0%. In the 2008 presidential election, Democrat Barack Obama received 51.6% of the vote (4,038 cast), ahead of Republican John McCain with 46.7% (3,656 votes) and other candidates with 1.0% (75 votes), among the 7,830 ballots cast by the borough's 10,180 registered voters, for a turnout of 76.9%. In the 2004 presidential election, Republican George W. Bush received 50.9% of the vote (3,881 ballots cast), outpolling Democrat John Kerry with 47.9% (3,648 votes) and other candidates with 0.6% (62 votes), among the 7,618 ballots cast by the borough's 10,422 registered voters, for a turnout percentage of 73.1.

In the 2013 gubernatorial election, Republican Chris Christie received 65.2% of the vote (3,051 cast), ahead of Democrat Barbara Buono with 33.0% (1,544 votes), and other candidates with 1.8% (83 votes), among the 4,778 ballots cast by the borough's 10,249 registered voters (100 ballots were spoiled), for a turnout of 46.6%. In the 2009 gubernatorial election, Republican Chris Christie received 52.2% of the vote (2,809 ballots cast), ahead of Democrat Jon Corzine with 36.3% (1,954 votes), Independent Chris Daggett with 10.0% (541 votes) and other candidates with 0.5% (27 votes), among the 5,385 ballots cast by the borough's 9,862 registered voters, yielding a 54.6% turnout.

Education

Public schools
The Madison Public Schools serve students in pre-kindergarten through twelfth grade. As of the 2018–19 school year, the district, comprised of five schools, had an enrollment of 2,646 students and 219.5 classroom teachers (on an FTE basis), for a student–teacher ratio of 12.1:1. Schools in the district (with 2018–19 enrollment data from the National Center for Education Statistics) are 
Central Avenue School (499 students; in grades Pre-K–5), 
Kings Road School (310; K–5), 
Torey J. Sabatini School (316; K–5), 
Madison Junior School (618; 6–8) and 
Madison High School (879; 9–12).

Students from Harding Township attend the district's high school as part of a sending/receiving relationship with the Harding Township School District.

Private schools

St. Vincent Martyr School (SVMS) is a Catholic parochial school, established in 1848, that serves students in grades Pre-K–3 through eight, operated under the auspices of the Saint Vincent Parish and the Roman Catholic Diocese of Paterson. SVMS is a recipient of the No Child Left Behind National Blue Ribbon School Award of Excellence for 2005–2006. Rainbow Montessori School, founded in 1981, is a Montessori school teaching children in Pre-K and kindergarten.

Higher education
Seton Hall College was established in Madison in 1856 and relocated to its location in South Orange, New Jersey in the late nineteenth century.

Drew University was founded in 1867 and continues to operate in Madison, on a wooded campus near downtown that was previously a private residence.

Fairleigh Dickinson University's Florham Campus is located in Madison on the former Twombly estate.

The Landmark Conference, an NCAA Division III conference, is based in Madison.

The College of Saint Elizabeth is located just outside the boundary, in Convent Station (Morris Township)

Transportation

Roads and highways

The main thoroughfare is Route 124 which connects with Morris Township in the northwest and Chatham Borough to the southeast.

Public transportation
NJ Transit's Madison station provides commuter service on the Morristown Line, with trains heading to Hoboken Terminal, and to Penn Station in Midtown Manhattan via the Kearny Connection.

NJ Transit provides local bus service on the 873 and 879 routes, replacing service that had been offered on the MCM3 and 966 until subsidies to the local providers were eliminated in 2010 as part of budget cuts.

Madison also has a private commuter bus line run by Boxcar Transit that operates five days a week, running directly to and from Midtown Manhattan.

A low-cost campus/downtown shuttle bus operates along Madison Avenue and Main Street during afternoon and evening hours.

Sister cities
Madison has three sister cities:
  Issy-les-Moulineaux, France
  Marigliano, Italy
  Madison, Connecticut, United States

Points of interest
 Drew University
 Thursday Morning Club
 Museum of Early Trades and Crafts
 Fairleigh Dickinson University
 Grace Episcopal Church
 The Shakespeare Theatre of New Jersey

Film and television
 Episodes of the television series, The Sopranos, were filmed in Madison. A scene was filmed on the Drew University campus, while another scene was filmed at Rod's Steak House, just west of the borough limits in Convent Station.
 Portions of A Beautiful Mind were filmed at Fairleigh Dickinson University.
 The Madison train station played the role of Cranford, New Jersey in the 2005 film, Guess Who starring Bernie Mac and Ashton Kutcher. The train station, the Hartley-Dodge Memorial building, and the center of Madison serve as backdrops to this movie, and a panorama of the borough is shown during the final credits.
 Hartley Dodge Memorial (Borough Hall) appears in a scene of The World According to Garp starring Glenn Close and Robin Williams.
 Establishing and long-distance shots for the 1982 series One of the Boys were shot at Drew University.
 Scenes from Rich and Famous (1981), George Cukor's final film, were shot on Lincoln Place, and show the Madison Theatre and the train station as backdrops, standing in for Northampton, Massachusetts.
 Scenes from So Fine (1981) were shot at Drew University.
 Scenes from The Family Stone (2005) were shot downtown at the intersection of Main Street and Waverly Place and Drew University. Despite the fact that the fictional town is supposed to be in New England, one may see a train, clearly marked New Jersey Transit, crossing through Waverly Place in one of the scenes. Additionally, the bus station featured in the movie was shot on Drew University's campus in Madison.
 An episode of Friday Night Lights was filmed in parts of Madison.
 Scenes from the television show Pretty Little Liars were filmed in Madison. The train station and Hartley Dodge memorial were visible as well as a separate aerial shot which shows behind 54 Main and Rocco's as well as the downtown main street area.
 Scenes from Woody Allen's Deconstructing Harry (1997) were filmed on the Drew University campus.
 Scenes from the 1973 film adaptation of From the Mixed-Up Files of Mrs. Basil E. Frankweiler entitled The Hideaways were filmed in downtown Madison.  Notably, the children get on the train at the Madison train station.
 The original 1968 green Ford Mustang GT driven by Steve McQueen in Bullitt disappeared until it was purchased by Madison resident Robert Kiernan in 1974 from an ad in Road & Track magazine.

Notable people

People who were born in, residents of, or otherwise closely associated with Madison include:

 Robert Adams (born 1937), photographer who has focused on the changing landscape of the American West
 Lincoln Brower (1931–2018), was an American entomologist and ecologist, best known for his research on monarch butterflies
 Andy Breckman (born 1955), creator and producer of television series Monk, former Saturday Night Live writer and radio personality
 Jonathan Edward Caldwell (born 1883), aeronautical engineer whose designs included an ornithopter, which would have flown by flapping its wings
 Robert L. Chapman (1920–2002), thesaurus editor
 Samuel S. Coursen (1926–1950), awarded the Medal of Honor for his actions during the Korean War
 Dick DeBiasse, automotive engineer and machinist (founder of AER Research, also located in Madison), is credited with having contributed to the success of the Lake Underwood team that established Porsche as a winning race car in the United States. He also did the motor work for Mark Donohue in the following decade.
 Geraldine Rockefeller Dodge (1882–1973), philanthropist and noted dog breeder and judge
 Marcellus Hartley Dodge Sr. (1881–1963), chairman of the board of Remington Arms
 Marcellus Hartley Dodge Jr. (1908–1930), heir to the Remington-Rockefeller fortune
 Alexander Duncan (1788–1853), Member of the United States House of Representatives from Ohio
 Jonathan Dwight (1858–1929), ornithologist
 Dean Faiello (born 1959), fake doctor convicted of operating without a license after the 2003 death of a patient
 Janeane Garofalo (born 1964), actor, comedian, author, and activist moved to Madison at age nine, where she remained until she graduated from high school
 Marcel Gleyre (1910–1996), gymnast who competed in the men's vault event at the 1932 Summer Olympics
 Mike Hall (born 1989), bassist
 Nick Mangold (born 1984), former NFL pro-bowl center with the New York Jets
 William McGurn (born 1958), former speechwriter for George W. Bush
 Ted Mitchell (1905–1985), American football center who played in the NFL for the Orange/Newark Tornadoes
 Don Newcombe (1926–2019), former Major League Baseball right-handed starting pitcher who played for the Brooklyn/Los Angeles Dodgers, Cincinnati Reds and Cleveland Indians
 Neil O'Donnell (born 1966), former NFL quarterback
 Greg Olear (born 1972), novelist
 Horace W. Palmer (1878–1953), lawyer and politician who served in the New York State Assembly
 Edward Irenaeus Prime-Stevenson (1858–1942), author of Imre: A Memorandum, who wrote under the pseudonym Xavier Mayne
 Aubrey Eugene Robinson Jr. (1923–2000), Chief Federal Judge of the District Court of the District of Columbia, appointed by Lyndon B. Johnson in 1966
 Jay P. Rolison Jr. (1929–2007), lawyer and politician from New York who served in the New York Senate from 1967 to 1990
 David Austin Sayre (1793–1870), silversmith
 David F. Sayre (1822–1919), Wisconsin State Assemblyman, farmer and lawyer
 JoJo Starbuck (born 1951), two-time Olympic competitor in figure skating
 William A. Starrett (1877–1932), builder who constructed the Empire State Building
 Mary Wilkinson Streep (1915–2001), fine artist and art editor
 Charles Henry Totty (1873–1939), horticulturist
 Eddie Trunk (born 1964), heavy metal radio host
 George Witte, poet and author of Deniability: Poems
 Marta Wittkowska (1882–1977), contralto opera singer

References

External links

 Madison borough website
 Madison Public Schools
 
 School Data for the Madison Public Schools, National Center for Education Statistics
 The Madison Eagle (local newspaper)
 The Daily Record (regional newspaper)
 Morris County map of its municipalities
 Hartley-Dodge Memorial
 Museum of Early Trades and Crafts
 St. Hubert's Animal Welfare Center
Madison-Chatham InJersey, community blog

 
1889 establishments in New Jersey
Borough form of New Jersey government
Boroughs in Morris County, New Jersey
Populated places established in 1889
Wyeth